The University of Chicago Law Review (Maroonbook abbreviation: U Chi L Rev) is the flagship law journal published by the University of Chicago Law School. It is among the top five most cited law reviews in the world. Up until 2020, it utilized a different citation system than most law journals—the Maroonbook rather than the Bluebook. The Law Review has announced, however, that it will be switching to the more commonly used Bluebook. It is published quarterly in print and also has an online companion, The University of Chicago Law Review Online.

History 
The Law Review was established in 1933. From 1942 through 1945 the review was published by the faculty due to declining student enrollment at the law school during World War II. Prominent former student members have included Judge Abner J. Mikva, Ohio Attorney General Richard Cordray, Princeton University president Christopher L. Eisgruber, and professor Geoffrey R. Stone (all editors-in-chief); Judges Danny Boggs, Robert Bork, Frank H. Easterbrook, Douglas H. Ginsburg, and David Tatel; professors Marvin Chirelstein, Daniel Fischel, Lawrence M. Friedman, Mary Ann Glendon, and Michael W. McConnell; religious leader Dallin H. Oaks; and co-founder of The Carlyle Group, David M. Rubenstein.

Content 
The Law Review is edited by student journal members (University of Chicago Law School students selected on the basis of their grades or performance on a writing assignment after the first year). It publishes articles written by scholars and lawyers from around the world, as well as student articles, or "Comments." Prominent legal figures who have published in the journal include:  Supreme Court Justices William J. Brennan Jr., Tom C. Clark, William O. Douglas, Felix Frankfurter, Antonin Scalia, and John Paul Stevens; Judges David L. Bazelon, Charles D. Breitel, Guido Calabresi, Henry Friendly, Richard Posner, Patricia Wald, Jack B. Weinstein, and Ralph K. Winter; Justice Roger Traynor of the California Supreme Court; and Professors Bruce Ackerman, Ronald Dworkin, H. L. A. Hart, Karl Llewellyn, John Rawls, John Henry Wigmore, Samuel Williston, and Brainerd Currie; and even J. Edgar Hoover.

According to the Journal Citation Reports, the journal has a 2016 impact factor of 2.284.

References

External links
 
Guide to the University of Chicago Law Review Records 1933-1987 at the University of Chicago Special Collections Research Center

American law journals
Publications established in 1933
University of Chicago Law School
Quarterly journals
English-language journals